The canton of Plénée-Jugon is an administrative division of the Côtes-d'Armor department, northwestern France. It was created at the French canton reorganisation which came into effect in March 2015. Its seat is in Plénée-Jugon.

It consists of the following communes:
 
Bréhand
Jugon-les-Lacs-Commune-Nouvelle
Le Mené
Penguily
Plédéliac
Plénée-Jugon
Plestan
Saint-Glen
Saint-Trimoël
Tramain
Trébry

References

Cantons of Côtes-d'Armor